Biohacking, biohacker, or biohack may refer to:

 Biohackers, 2020 German techno-thriller streaming television series

Science and medicine
 Body hacking, the application of the hacker ethic to improve one's own body
 CRISPR gene editing, genetic engineering technique in molecular biology by which the genomes of living organisms may be modified
 Do-it-yourself biology, movement in which individuals and small organizations study biology
 Gene knockout, genetic engineering technique that involves the targeted removal or inactivation of a specific gene within an organism's genome
 Quantified self, measuring various biomarkers and behaviors to try to optimize health
 Performance psychology, improving ones mental and behavioural capabilities to boost performance
 Synthetic biology, field of science that involves redesigning organisms for useful purposes by engineering them to have new abilities

See also
 Nootropic, drugs, supplements, and other substances to improve cognitive function in healthy individuals
 Nutrigenomics, study of the relationship between human genome, nutrition and health
 Self-experimentation in medicine, scientific experimentation in which the experimenter conducts the experiment on themselves